Peter Albert Iles (born 23 December 1926) is an American engineer and former New Zealand cricketer. He played two first-class matches for Auckland between 1946 and 1952.

Iles studied at Auckland University College, graduating Bachelor of Science in 1948, and Master of Science with second-class honours in 1952. He later moved to the United States, settling in California and becoming an American citizen, where he worked as an engineer developing solar cells, including those used on early American satellites. In 1991, Iles received the William R. Cherry Award from the IEEE Electron Devices Society for his prolonged and sustained contribution to the field of photovoltaic conversion. He continued to publish on the subject until at least 2004, contributing a chapter, "Photovoltaic conversion: space applications", to the Encyclopedia of Energy published by Elsevier that year.

See also
 List of Auckland representative cricketers

References

External links
 

1926 births
Living people
New Zealand cricketers
Auckland cricketers
Cricketers from Palmerston North
University of Auckland alumni
New Zealand emigrants to the United States
American electrical engineers
Naturalized citizens of the United States